The Second Deakin ministry (Protectionist) was the 5th ministry of the Government of Australia. It was led by the country's 2nd Prime Minister, Alfred Deakin. The Second Deakin ministry succeeded the Reid ministry, which dissolved on 5 July 1905 following the resignation of George Reid after the Protectionists withdrew their support and gained support from the Labour Party. The ministry was replaced by the First Fisher ministry on 13 November 1908 after the Labour Party withdrew their support and formed their own minority government.

Isaac Isaacs, who died in 1948, was the last surviving member of the Second Deakin ministry.

Ministry

References

Ministries of Edward VII
Deakin, 2
1905 establishments in Australia
1908 disestablishments in Australia
Cabinets established in 1905
Cabinets disestablished in 1908